Alfred Bayer (born March 8, 1933 in Munich) is a German politician, representative of the Christian Social Union of Bavaria.

He graduated in economics from the Ludwig-Maximilians University in Munich in 1957. From 1994-2004 he was the chairman of the Hanns Seidel Foundation.

See also
List of Bavarian Christian Social Union politicians

References

Christian Social Union in Bavaria politicians
1933 births
Living people
Knights Commander of the Order of Merit of the Federal Republic of Germany
Lufthansa people